Graceful may refer to:
 Graceful 4, TSZX The Grace 's first Japanese album released on November 14, 2007
 Graceful & Charming, a song in The Hard and the Easy album by Great Big Sea
 Graceful exit, a simple programming idiom in a program to detect and manage a serious error condition
 Graceful labeling, a type of graph labeling
 Graceful degradation, a property enabling a system to continue operating properly in the event of the failure of some of its components
 Graceful World, a song by Japanese j-pop group Every Little Thing released on February 21, 2001
 A Gentleman's Guide to Graceful Living, a novel by Michael Dahlie
 Edge-graceful labeling, a type of graph labeling
 Saint Nerses the Graceful (1098–1173), a Catholicos of Armenia (1166–1173), theologian, poet, writer and hymn composer
 The Graceful Fallen Mango, an album by experimental rock band Dirty Projectors
 The Graceful Ghost, an album by Grey DeLisle released in 2004

See also 

 Gracilis (disambiguation), a Latin adjective with neither logical nor etymological connection to "graceful".
 Christy (given name), a given name meaning graceful